Eduardo da Conceição Maciel or simply Eduardo (born 12 November 1986), is a Brazilian professional footballer who plays as a forward.

Career
Eduardo was born in Nova Iguaçu.

On 26 July 2014, Eduardo signed for Azerbaijan Premier League team AZAL on a two-year contract. In February 2015, during a reserve game for AZAL, suffered a season-ending injury that would require surgery.

In September 2015 Eduardo moved from AZAL to fellow Azerbaijan Premier League side Zira FK, again signing a two-year contract. During the winter break of the 2015–16 season, Eduardo left Zira.

In 2016 he played for Persegres Gresik United in the Indonesia Super League. He then had a short stint in the lower leagues of Brazil.

After only five appearances in 2018 the contract with Olimpia Elbląg was mutually terminated.

Career statistics

Honours 
Individual
 Lebanese Premier League Best Goal: 2012–13

References

External links
 
 
 
 Eduardo da Conceição Maciel at ZeroZero

1986 births
Living people
Brazilian footballers
Association football forwards
J1 League players
II liga players
Azerbaijan Premier League players
Bahraini Premier League players
Lebanese Premier League players
Nagoya Grampus players
Botafogo de Futebol e Regatas players
Rot Weiss Ahlen players
OKS Stomil Olsztyn players
Zira FK players
Stal Kraśnik players
Sport Club Corinthians Alagoano players
Akhaa Ahli Aley FC players
Riffa SC players
AZAL PFK players
Gresik United players
Olimpia Elbląg players
Olímpia Futebol Clube players
Brazilian expatriate footballers
Expatriate footballers in Japan
Brazilian expatriate sportspeople in Japan
Expatriate footballers in Germany
Brazilian expatriate sportspeople in Germany
Expatriate footballers in Poland
Brazilian expatriate sportspeople in Poland
Expatriate footballers in Lebanon
Brazilian expatriate sportspeople in Lebanon
Expatriate footballers in Azerbaijan
Brazilian expatriate sportspeople in Azerbaijan
Expatriate footballers in Indonesia
Brazilian expatriate sportspeople in Indonesia
Expatriate footballers in Bahrain
Brazilian expatriate sportspeople in Bahrain
People from Nova Iguaçu
Sportspeople from Rio de Janeiro (state)